Nick Perry (born December 7, 1991) is an American football coach and former safety who is the assistant defensive backs coach for the Atlanta Falcons of the National Football League (NFL).

Playing career
Perry played safety for five seasons at the University of Alabama coming out of Prattville High School under Nick Saban. There he won consecutive BCS National Championships in 2011 and 2012. He was not selected during the 2015 NFL draft, so Perry signed as an undrafted free agent with the Ravens and was on their  practice squad during 2015. In 2016 he was a member of the Philadelphia Eagles, but was released after training camp.

Coaching career

Alabama
Perry began his coaching career at his alma mater in Alabama in 2017 as a graduate assistant. He remained a graduate assistant until the end of the 2017 when he was given the title of analyst for the 2019 season.

Atlanta Falcons
In 2021 Perry made the jump to the NFL as an assistant defensive backs coach for the Atlanta Falcons.

References

1991 births
21st-century African-American sportspeople
Living people
African-American coaches of American football
African-American players of American football
Alabama Crimson Tide football players
Alabama Crimson Tide football coaches
American football safeties
Atlanta Falcons coaches
Baltimore Ravens players
People from Prattville, Alabama
Philadelphia Eagles players
Players of American football from Alabama